The American Athletic Conference is an NCAA Division I conference that sponsors championships in 22 sports (10 men's and 12 women's). For every sport except football, the champion is determined using a postseason tournament or meet.

Members 

The American has 11 full member institutions:

 Cincinnati*
 East Carolina
 Houston*
 Memphis
 South Florida
 SMU
 Temple
 Tulane
 Tulsa
 UCF*
 Wichita State (non-football member)
* - Denotes schools which are departing from the conference beginning in the 2023–24 school year. It is possible that Cincinnati and UCF could remain in the American as affiliate members for women's lacrosse and men's soccer, respectively, as the Big 12 does not sponsor those sports, though no formal announcement has been made.

In addition, the conference has 5 current affiliate members:
 Florida (women's lacrosse)
 Navy (football)
 Old Dominion (women's lacrosse and women's rowing)
 Sacramento State (women's rowing)
 Vanderbilt (women's lacrosse)

Future members 
There are six schools who are scheduled to join the American as full members in the 2023–24 school year:

 Charlotte†
 Florida Atlantic*†
 North Texas*
 Rice*
 UAB†
 UTSA
*- Denotes schools joining as affiliate members for the 2022–23 school year in women's swimming and diving.

†- Denotes schools joining as affiliate members for the 2022–23 school year in men's soccer.

In addition to the five future full members that are joining as affiliate members in 2022–23, there are two other schools joining as affiliate members in 2022–23:

 FIU (men's soccer and women's swimming and diving)
 James Madison (women's lacrosse)

Membership timeline 

 

Key: MS – Men's Soccer; WSD – Women's Swimming and Diving; WR – Women's rowing; WL – Women's lacrosse

Most recent champions

2022–23

2021–22

Baseball 
Baseball is sponsored by 8 of the 11 full members of the AAC. The only schools which do not sponsor baseball are SMU, Temple, and Tulsa (though Temple had a team in the 2014 season, which was dropped after that season). Of the six schools joining the AAC in 2023–24, all besides North Texas sponsor baseball.

†: No longer members of the conference

Men's basketball 
All 11 full members of the American support men's basketball, making it the only men's sport sponsored by every team in the conference. Men's basketball is also played by each of the six members joining the American in 2023–24.

†: No longer members of the conference

Women's basketball 
Like men's basketball, women's basketball is also sponsored by all 11 full members of the conference. It is also played by all six schools joining The American in 2023–24.

†: No longer members of the conference

Men's cross country 
Men's cross country is supported by 9 of the 11 teams in the AAC. The only full members that don't sponsor it are SMU and UCF. It is sponsored by five of the six schools joining the American in 2023–24, with UAB being the only one that does not sponsor it.

†: No longer members of the conference

Women's cross country 
Unlike men's cross country, women's cross country is sponsored by every full member of the conference. It is also sponsored by all six schools joining the conference in 2023–24.

†: No longer members of the conference

Football 
Football is sponsored by every full member of the American except for Wichita State. Affiliate member Navy also plays football in the conference. All six schools joining the conference in 2023–24 sponsor football as well.

Men's golf 
Tulane and Tulsa are the only schools in the conference that do not sponsor men's golf, though Tulsa did until the 2016 season. All six schools joining the AAC in 2023–24 sponsor men's golf as well.

Women's golf 
Temple is the only full member of the conference that doesn't sponsor women's golf. Rice is the only one out of the six teams joining the AAC in 2023–24 that does not sponsor women's golf.

†: No longer members of the conference

Women's lacrosse 
Only 3 full members of the conference offer women's lacrosse, which the conference began sponsoring in 2019. Those schools are Cincinnati, East Carolina, and Temple. 3 affiliate members play women's lacrosse in the AAC: Florida, Old Dominion, and Vanderbilt. South Florida has announced plans for a women's lacrosse team to begin play in the 2024 season. None of the six schools joining the conference in 2023–24 sponsor women's lacrosse, though Charlotte has announced that they will have a team beginning in 2025; Cincinnati may also remain as an affiliate member of the AAC for women's lacrosse as their future conference, the Big 12, does not sponsor it. James Madison University will be joining the AAC as a women's lacrosse affiliate member in 2022–23.

Women's rowing 
4 full members offer women's rowing: SMU, Temple, Tulsa, and UCF. They are joined by affiliate members Old Dominion and Sacramento State. Villanova competed as an affiliate member in rowing from 2013 to 2015 before leaving for the Colonial Athletic Association and San Diego State competed as an affiliate member in rowing from 2015 to 2021 but discontinued their program because of financial difficulties caused by the COVID-19 pandemic. It is not sponsored by any of the six schools joining the American in 2023–24.

†: No longer members of the conference

Men's soccer 
Men's soccer is offered by 6 members of the conference: Memphis, South Florida, SMU, Temple, Tulsa, and UCF. Cincinnati also had a men's soccer team before cutting it in April 2020. Charlotte, FAU, FIU and UAB will be joining the conference in 2022–23 as affiliate members for men's soccer. It is possible that UCF may remain in the AAC as an affiliate member for men's soccer after departing for the Big 12 as their future conference does not sponsor men's soccer.

†: No longer members of the conference

Women's soccer 
Women's soccer is sponsored by every school in the conference except Tulane and Wichita State. It is sponsored by all six schools joining the conference in 2023–24.

†: No longer members of the conference

Softball 
Softball is sponsored by 7 of the 11 schools in the conference, the only ones who don't play are Cincinnati, SMU, Temple, and Tulane (though Temple sponsored it until 2014). It is played by every school joining the AAC in 2023–24 besides Rice.

†: No longer members of the conference

Men's swimming and diving 
Only 2 schools in the conference, Cincinnati and SMU, offer men's swimming and diving. East Carolina competed in the sport until 2020 but eliminated the program in the wake of the COVID-19 pandemic. FAU is the only one out of the six schools joining the AAC in 2023–24 who sponsors men's swimming and diving.

†: No longer members of the conference

Women's swimming and diving 
The conference features 5 women's swimming and diving teams: Cincinnati, East Carolina, Houston, SMU, and Tulane. They will be joined by FAU, FIU, North Texas, and Rice when those schools become affiliate members of the conference in 2022–23, though Rice only competes in swimming, not diving.

†: No longer members of the conference

Men's tennis 
Every school in the American besides Cincinnati, East Carolina, and Houston offers men's tennis; though East Carolina offered the sport until 2020 when it was dropped due to budget concerns brought on by the COVID-19 pandemic. Five of the six schools joining the conference in 2023–24 sponsor men's tennis, with North Texas being the only one that doesn't.

Women's tennis 
All AAC schools sponsor women's tennis, as do all six schools joining in 2023–24.

Men's track and field

Men's indoor 
Men's indoor track & field is sponsored by seven AAC schools: Cincinnati, East Carolina, Houston, Memphis, South Florida, Tulsa, and Wichita State. Of the members joining in 2023–24, it is sponsored by Charlotte, North Texas, Rice, and UTSA. Temple sponsored the sport in 2014 but dropped it after that season.

Men's outdoor 
Men's outdoor track and field is sponsored by all the same schools that sponsor men's indoor track and field with the addition of Tulane. It is sponsored by the same four future members that sponsor indoor track and field. Like with men's indoor track and field, Temple sponsored men's outdoor track and field until 2014.

†: No longer members of the conference

Women's track and field 
Every school in the conference sponsors both indoor and outdoor women's track and field. Each of the six members joining in 2023–24 sponsor both indoor and outdoor track and field as well.

Women's indoor

Women's outdoor 

†: No longer members of the conference

Volleyball 
Every AAC school sponsors women's volleyball. All six schools joining in 2023–24 sponsor women's volleyball as well. No American Conference member, whether current or future, sponsors men's volleyball.

†: No longer members of the conference

Summary

Full members 
Note: Shared titles (ex: 2014 football, 2020 men's basketball) are counted as a full title for each co-champion.

Accurate as of May 9, 2022.

*- Does not include vacated championships

†- No longer a member of the AAC

‡- Affiliate member

See also 

 American Athletic Conference
 American Athletic Conference baseball tournament
 American Athletic Conference men's basketball tournament
 American Athletic Conference women's basketball tournament
 American Athletic Conference Football Championship Game
 American Athletic Conference men's soccer tournament
 American Athletic Conference women's soccer tournament
 American Athletic Conference softball tournament

References

External links 
 American Athletic Conference website

American Athletic Conference
American Athletic Conference